Belknap Township is a township in Pottawattamie County, Iowa, USA.

History 
Belknap Township is named for William W. Belknap.

See also
Gen. William Worth Belknap House

References

Townships in Pottawattamie County, Iowa
Townships in Iowa